The Grand Lodge of Tennessee, officially the Grand Lodge of the Ancient and Honorable Fraternity of Free and Accepted Masons of the State of Tennessee, is the main governing body of Freemasonry within Tennessee. This Grand Lodge was established in Knoxville, Tennessee, on December 27, 1813, by nine Masonic lodges operating within the state. In 2017, the Grand Lodge of Tennessee had a reported membership of 34,858 Master Masons, and by 2020 the membership had fallen only slightly to 33,200.

The Grand Lodge is headquartered in Nashville, Tennessee, in the Grand Lodge Building.

History

Formation
Freemasonry in Tennessee began in 1789 when St. Tammany Lodge #1 was organized in Nashville under dispensation from the Grand Lodge of North Carolina. St. Tammany Lodge received its full charter from the Grand Lodge of North Carolina in January 1796, and later changed its name to Harmony Lodge #1 in November 1800. Harmony Lodge 1 was dissolved due to inactivity on December 9, 1808.

As part of regularity, lodges must receive a dispensation from a duly-recognized Grand Lodge to begin work and then receive a charter from that Grand Lodge to be a fully established lodge. The original lodges in Tennessee were chartered by the Grand Lodge of North Carolina, which from 1803 to 1813 used the name "The Grand Lodge of North Carolina and Tennessee." The Grand Lodge of North Carolina established nine lodges in Tennessee before the Grand Lodge of Tennessee was formed.

The second lodge was Tennessee Lodge #2 in Knoxville, Tennessee, which received its dispensation from the Grand Lodge of North Carolina on January 15, 1800, and its Charter on November 30, 1800, with John Sevier as its first Worshipful Master. Greeneville Lodge #3 in Greeneville, Tennessee, was granted dispensation on September 5, 1801, and chartered on December 11, 1801. Newport Lodge #4 in Newport, Tennessee, was granted dispensation in 1805 and chartered on December 5, 1806. Overton Lodge #5 in Rogersville, Tennessee, was granted dispensation in 1806 and Chartered on November 21, 1807. Hiram Lodge #7 in Franklin, Tennessee, was granted dispensation in 1808 and Chartered  on December 11, 1809. Cumberland Lodge #8 in Nashville, Tennessee, was granted dispensation on June 24, 1812, and was later chartered by the Grand Lodge of Tennessee on February 8, 1814. Western Star Lodge #9 in Port Royal, Tennessee, was granted dispensation on May 1, 1812, and chartered by the Grand Lodge of North Carolina on February 12, 1813.

A convention was held in Knoxville with representatives from the lodges operating in Tennessee, and, on December 2, 1811, the convention adopted a resolution to form a Grand Lodge within Tennessee and petition the Grand Lodge of North Carolina and Tennessee to release its jurisdiction over the State of Tennessee. On December 5, 1812, the Grand Lodge of North Carolina and Tennessee adopted a resolution approving of the petition, and on September 30, 1813, the Grand Lodge of North Carolina and Tennessee released its jurisdiction over the Tennessee lodges so they may establish the Grand Lodge of Tennessee. A Grand Convention was held in Knoxville on December 27, 1813 to establish the Grand Lodge and elect the officers. Thomas Claiborne, an attorney and member of the Tennessee General Assembly from Davidson County, was unanimously elected Grand Master. He appointed George Wilson, an attorney and member of the General Assembly from Knox County, as Deputy Grand Master; John Hall as Grand Senior Warden; Abraham Shaifer as Grand Junior Warden; Thomas McCorry as Grand Treasurer; and Edward Scott as Grand Secretary.

Schools

During the mid-1800s, local lodges established or sponsored several schools and colleges. These included the Masonic Female Institute in Hartsville, the Masonic Male College in Gallatin, the Clifton Masonic Academy in Clifton, the Petersburg Masonic Academy in Petersburg, the Macon Masonic Male College in Macon, the Sale Creek Male and Female Institute in Sale Creek, the Hiwassee Masonic Institute in Charleston, the Masonic College in Dayton, and the Masonic & Odd Fellows College in Nolensville.

The Grand Lodge of Tennessee established the Masonic University in Clarksville, Tennessee, for the education of the children and orphans of indigent Masons. The Masonic University began operation 1849 as the "Masonic College" with an enrollment of 105 students. In 1850, the Grand Lodge completed the main building for the school. This building became known as Castle Building because of its distinctive architecture, and it stood until its collapse in 1946. In 1855, the Masonic University was purchased by the Presbyterian Church and renamed Stewart College in honor of the college's president. Stewart College was later renamed "Southwestern Presbyterian College" in 1875, and renamed "Southwestern" when the school moved to Memphis, Tennessee, in 1925. It was later renamed Rhodes College in 1984. The original campus of the Masonic University is now the site of Austin Peay State University.

Grand Masters
The following have served as Grand Master:

  

 1813: Thomas Claiborne
 1814: Thomas Claiborne
 1815: Robert Searcy
 1816: Robert Searcy
 1817: Wilkins F. Tannehill
 1818: Wilkins F. Tannehill
 1819: Oliver Bliss Hayes
 1820: Wilkins F. Tannehill
 1821: Wilkins F. Tannehill
 1822: Andrew Jackson
 1823: Andrew Jackson
 1824: Wilkins F. Tannehill
 1825: Matthew Delamare Cooper
 1826: Matthew Delamare Cooper
 1827: William Edwin Kennedy
 1828: William Edwin Kennedy
 1829: Hugh White Dunlap
 1830: Hugh White Dunlap
 1831: Archibald Yell
 1832: Dudley Smith Jennings
 1833: Harry Lightfoot Douglass
 1834: Benjamin S. Tappan
 1835: Benjamin S. Tappan
 1836: Julius Caesar Nichols Robertson
 1837: Philander McB. Priestly
 1838: Samuel McManus
 1839: Samuel McManus
 1840: George Alexander Wilson
 1841: Wilkins F. Tannehill
 1842: Wilkins F. Tannehill
 1843: Joseph Norbell
 1844: Edmund Dillahunty
 1845: Edmund Dillahunty
 1846: William Lucas Martin
 1847: William Lucas Martin
 1848: Hardy Murfree Burton
 1849: Robert Looney Caruthers
 1850: Charles Arnold Fuller
 1851: Charles Arnold Fuller
 1852: Archelaus Madison Hughes
 1853: Archelaus Madison Hughes
 1854: John Snyder Dashiell
 1855: John Snyder Dashiell
 1856: Thomas McCulloch
 1857: Thomas McCulloch
 1858: John Frizzell
 1859: John Frizzell
 1860: James McCallum
 1861: James McCallum
 1862: James McCallum
 1863: Archelaus Madison Hughes
 1864: Thomas Aaron Hamilton
 1865: Thomas Aaron Hamilton
 1866: Joseph Motley Anderson
 1867: Joseph Motley Anderson
 1868: Jonathan Smith Dawson
 1869: John Walker Paxton
 1870: John Calvin Brown
 1871: William Munroe Dunaway
 1872: Donifas Russel Grafton
 1873: James Daniel Richardson
 1874: Andrew Jackson Wheeler
 1875: Jefferson Campbell Cawood
 1876: Elihu Edmondson
 1877: Americus Vespucius Warr
 1878: George Cooper Connor
 1879: Wilbur Fisk Foster
 1880: John Thomas Iron
 1881: No Annual Communication held
 1882: Nathan Sullins Woodward
 1883: Newton Whitfield McConnell
 1884: Benjamin Rufus Harris
 1885: Henry Martyn Aiken
 1886: Thomas Owen Morris
 1887: Caswell Anderson Goodloe
 1888: Henry Hulburt Ingersoll
 1889: John Thomas Williamson
 1890: Benjamin Franklin Haller
 1891: William Swan Smith
 1892: Montreville Dillon SMallman
 1893: Bernard Francis Price
 1894: Henry Alexander Chambers
 1895: George Hampton Morgan
 1896: Phillip Neely Matlock
 1897: Archibald Nevils Sloan
 1898: William Hill Bumpus
 1899: Joseph Holmes Bullock
 1900: James Henry McClister
 1901: Isaac Jones Thurman
 1902: John Robert Smith
 1903: Edmond Preston McQueen
 1904: James Loyd Sloan
 1905: James William Irwin
 1906: Robert Burrow
 1907: George Edward Seay
 1908: Milton Humphries Price
 1909: Edward Kelsey Bachman
 1910: Charles Hall Byrn
 1911: John Rush Rison
 1912: John Lynn Bachman
 1913: Charles Comstock
 1914: Thomas Jefferson Bonner
 1915: Teda Ashabel Hisey
 1916: Charles Barham
 1917: John Thomas Peeler
 1918: Samuel Chase Brown
 1919: Thomas Jefferson Brandon; Thomas Steele, Jr.
 1920: Taylor Williams Peace
 1921: Rodney Blake
 1922: Walker Mooring Taylor
 1923: George Lee Hardwick
 1924: Howell Edmonds Jackson
 1925: Charles Wesson Polk
 1926: Andrew Edward McCulloch
 1927: Henry Lee Fox
 1928: Stanley Wilton McDowell
 1929: Quincy Adams Tipton
 1930: Edward Ross Burr
 1931: Robert Virgil Hope
 1932: William Porter Chandler
 1933: Jesse Baldwin Templeton
 1934: Alfred Wells Lassiter
 1935: Martin Smith Roberts
 1936: William Roy Holland
 1937: Neale Mulligan Rutland
 1938: Charles H. McKinney
 1939: Lindsay Brassfield Phillips
 1940: Paul Fisher Lanius
 1941: Samuel Howard Cooper
 1942: William Wade Herron
 1943: Arch Erwin McClanahan
 1944: Burton Freeman Whitaker
 1945: Benjamin Tate Dawkins
 1946: Addison Brown McClure
 1947: John Calvin Crawford
 1948: Anderson Lacy Price
 1949: Lucien Campbell Connell
 1950: Elbert Carlton Coleman
 1951: Wallace Phelan Douglas
 1952: Amzie Hall Kirkpatrick
 1953: Clyde Hubert Wilson
 1954: Raymond Lee Allen
 1955: Hardin Henry Conn
 1956: Nathan Linville Roberts
 1957: James Walker Jerr
 1958: William Josiah Sanders, Jr.
 1959: Euel Guy Frizzell
 1960: Wiley Odell May
 1961: Lewis Aubrey Hagan
 1962: Samuel Edward Stephenson, Sr.
 1963: John Elvis Malone
 1964: Ralph Francis Worthy
 1965: Francis Carter Yearwood
 1966: James Edgar McFadin
 1967: Daniel Porter Henegar
 1968: James Philip Quisenberry
 1969: John Riley
 1970: Coy Henderson Duke
 1971: Charles Burton Jones, Jr.
 1972: Joseph Clinton Mobley
 1973: Daniel Shirley Johnson
 1974: James Castro Smith
 1975: George Robert Baddour
 1976: James Peek Buck
 1977: Gus J. Vlasis
 1978: George Edward Rothrock
 1979: Leslie Leon Farmer
 1980: Ray Wayland Pearson
 1981: Danny Wayne Seaton
 1982: John Taylor Pigg
 1983: John Burton Arp, Jr.
 1984: James Emmit McDaniel
 1985: Samuel David Chandler
 1986: Gus J. Vlasis
 1987: Walter Douglas Ric
 1988: Billie Reginald Brown
 1989: Lilburn Bruce Austin
 1990: Jethro Davidson Tisdale
 1991: John David Templeton
 1992: William Benjamin Anderson
 1993: Robert F. Henderson, Sr.
 1994: Thomas Earl Hager
 1995: Charles J. Eads, Jr.
 1996: Alton E. Tollison
 1997: John Lawrence Palmer
 1998: Walter E. Wininger
 1999: John Vincent
 2000: Kenneth Irwin Wright
 2001: Esco Owens
 2002: Joe C. Harrison
 2003: Ronald Jasper Coates
 2004: Richard E. Durham, Sr.
 2005: Paul L. Phillips
 2006: Sid C. Dorris III
 2007: Orville R. Armstrong
 2008: Jerry Lynn Hanson
 2009: Dickie Wayland Johnson
 2010: Thomas Boduch
 2011: Mack Evans Johnson
 2012: Laddie Lann Wilson
 2013: Roy Clinton Etherton
 2014: Delbert R. Musick
 2015: Phillip Dwight Hastings
 2016: Billy Ray Cutlip
 2017: Casey Lee Hood
 2018: Dickie McKinney
 2019: Robert Thomas Reed

See also
List of Tennessee Freemasons

References

Freemasonry in Tennessee
Freemasonry in the United States
Organizations based in Tennessee